Murashko, Murashka or Muraška is a surname. Notable people with the surname include:

Alexander Murashko (born 1971), Belarusian figure skater
Andrey Murashko (born 1975), Belarusian fencer
Mikhail Murashko (born 1967), Russian Minister of Health
Mykola Murashko (1844–1909), Ukrainian painter
Oleksandr Murashko (1875–1919), Ukrainian painter, nephew of Mykola
Rolandas Muraška (born 1973), Lithuanian tennis player

See also
 

Ukrainian-language surnames
Belarusian-language surnames